The Kraków Voivodeship was a voivodeship of the Congress Poland, that existed from 1816 to 1837. Until 6 December 1816, its capital was Miechów, and since then it was Kielce. It was established on 16 January 1816, from Kraków Department, and existed until 23 February 1837, when it was replaced by the Kraków Governorate. During the January Uprising, the Polish National Government, announced the re-establishment of the voivodeships with the borders from 1816, reestablishing the administration of the Kraków Voivodeship within the part of Radom Governorate. It existed from 1863 to 1864, when it was abolished, and replaced by the Radom Governorate. It was named after the nearby historic city of Kraków, which itself wasn't located in the voivodeship, and was instead located in the Free City of Cracow.

Subdivisions 
 Kielce District (seat: Kielce)
 Kielce County (seat: Kielce)
 Jędrzejów County (seat: Jędrzejów)
 Miechów District (seat: Miechów)
 Kraków County
 Miechów County (seat: Miechów)
 Szkalbmierz County (seat: Szkalbmierz)
 Olkusz District (seat: Olkusz)
 Lelów County (seat: Lelów)
 Olkusz County (seat: Olkusz)
 Pileca County (seat: Pileca)
 Stobnica County (seat: Stobnica)
 Szydłów County (seat: Szydłów)

Citations

Notes

References 

Voivodeships of the Congress Poland
History of Lesser Poland
Kielce
States and territories established in 1816
States and territories disestablished in 1837
States and territories established in 1863
States and territories disestablished in 1864
1863 establishments in Poland